Don't Lose the Money is a 2014 Philippine television game show broadcast by GMA Network. Hosted by Tom Rodriguez, it premiered on September 22, 2014 on the network's morning line up. The show concluded on December 22, 2014 with a total of 66 episodes.

Ratings
According to AGB Nielsen Philippines' Mega Manila household television ratings, the pilot episode of Don't Lose the Money earned an 11% rating. While the final episode scored a 7.9% rating.

References

2014 Philippine television series debuts
2014 Philippine television series endings
Filipino-language television shows
GMA Network original programming
Philippine game shows
Philippine television series based on non-Philippine television series